The Chamberlain River is a river in the Kimberley region of Western Australia.

The headwaters of the river rise in the Durack Range near Yulumbu. The river flows in a northerly direction along the range until it merges with the Pentecost River near El Questro Station.

The traditional owners of the area are the Kitja people.

The river was named in 1901 by the surveyor Frederick Brockman. It is thought that the river was named after either the shipbuilder, William Chamberlain or the politician Joseph Chamberlain.

References

Rivers of the Kimberley region of Western Australia